The Vietnamese records in swimming are the fastest ever performances of swimmers from Vietnam, which are recognised and ratified by the Vietnam Aquatic Sports Association (Hiệp hội thể thao dưới nước Việt Nam VASA).

All records were set in finals unless noted otherwise.

Long Course (50 m)

Men

Women

Mixed relay

Short Course (25 m)

Men

Women

References

External links
 Vietnam Aquatic Sports Association web site

Vietnam
Swimming
Records
Swimming